Sacramento Magazine, sometimes titled Sacramento, is a monthly regional magazine based in Sacramento, California, published and owned by Hour Media. The magazine was established in 1975. Mike O'Brien bought the magazine from Micromedia Affiliates, based in Morristown, New Jersey, in 1993. In 2015  Hour Media LLC, based in Michigan, acquired the Sacramento Magazines Corporation. Since then Joe Chiodo has been the publisher and Krista Minard is the editor of the magazine.

The magazine has 25,000 monthly subscribers and 7,500 newsstand copies. It was a member of the City and Regional Magazine Association (CRMA).

References

External links
 

Lifestyle magazines published in the United States
Monthly magazines published in the United States
Local interest magazines published in the United States
Magazines established in 1975
Magazines published in California
Mass media in Sacramento, California